Moussa El-Gelidi (born 14 April 1932) is an Egyptian boxer. He competed in the men's middleweight event at the 1960 Summer Olympics.

References

1932 births
Living people
Egyptian male boxers
Olympic boxers of Egypt
Boxers at the 1960 Summer Olympics
Sportspeople from Alexandria
Middleweight boxers
20th-century Egyptian people